The Krewe of ALLA is a coed krewe and social organization.

History and formation 
The Krewe of ALLA was formed November 1932, and was originally sponsored by the West Side Carnival and Social Club, Inc. In 1978 the Krewe reorganized as the Golden Gryphon Society, Inc. The name ALLA is taken from ALgiers, LA., where the organization was originally formed.

Originally an all-male Krewe, Alla became co-ed in 2014. The Krewe of Alla celebrated their 90th anniversary with 2022's parade.

Membership 
Krewe of ALLA accepts membership from all men and women age 16 and older.

Parade

Parade themes

Royal court
Krewe of Alla annually present a royal court which includes a king and queen named the Maharajah and the Maharanee.

Throws
Trinkets, collectables, masks, and beads tossed by hand from riders of the floats are called throws. Collectible throws from Krewe of ALLA include custom beads, footballs, frisbees, and foam swords.

Krewe of ALLA is known for their hand decorated genie lamps, their signature throw.

References 

Mardi Gras in New Orleans
1932 establishments in Louisiana